Keturi Bil Khat Pam is a village located in the Majuli district, in the northeastern state of Assam, India.

Demography
In the 2011 census, Missamora had 2 families with a population of 3, consisting of 3 males and 0 females. The population of children aged 0–6 was 0, making up 0% of the total population of the village. The average sex ratio was 0 out of 1000, which is lower than the state average of 958 out of 1000. The child sex ratio in the village was 0 out of 1000, which is lower than the average of 962 out of 1000 in the state of Assam.

References

Villages in Majuli district